Juliana R. Force (December 25, 1876August 28, 1948) was an American art museum administrator and director. Force started her career as a collector of folk art and as a secretary to socialite art collectors. She initiated the first display of American folk art in the United States. Force became a director of art galleries and of a temporary museum of American art in Greenwich Village in New York City that became the Whitney Museum of American Art.

Early life and education
Force was born Julianna Reiser in Doylestown, Pennsylvania, on December 25, 1876 to Juliana and Maximillian Reiser, a grocer and a hatter. She became known as "Juliana". Besides her twin sister, Force had seven other siblings. Force's last name was originally spelled Reiser but she later changed the spelling to Rieser. The Reiser family moved to Hoboken, New Jersey, in 1886. Juliana attended a Christian boarding school for girls. For a short time in 1908, she taught at a secretarial business school in Manhattan, New York City. At the age of 35, Juliana married Willard Force, a dentist, then became known as "Juliana Rieser Force", "Juliana Reiser Force" and "Juliana R. Force", which is sometimes shortened to "Juliana Force".

Career
Force's first job was as the personal secretary of socialite Helen Hay Whitney. In 1914, at the age of 38, Force became the secretary for Whitney's  sister-in-law Gertrude Vanderbilt Whitney, a great-granddaughter of "Commodore" Cornelius Vanderbilt and eldest surviving daughter of Cornelius Vanderbilt II. Whitney was a sculptor and art collector who had inherited Vanderbilt's fortune. Force's first duty was helping to organize art exhibitions at the Colony Club, an exclusive women's social club in New York City. Here, Force showed Whitney's collection of works by "The Eight", a group of radical modern artists. Whitney insisted all kinds of art, including art of differing styles, from new artists should be represented to the public, and wanted to display her collection of work along with art from Modernist artists, especially living Americans.

Force initiated the Early American Art collection, the first gallery display of American folk art in the United States. It included naïve engravings, velvet paintings, portraits, cigar store Indians, a ship's figurehead, brass bootjack, and pewter serving bowls. Her ratification of this style of art led to the first public exhibition of folk art in the United States. On February 9, 1924, she began a presentation of folk art in a Whitney gallery that she administered, intending to bring folk-art attractiveness closer to the level of contemporary art.  Force opened her exhibit on February 9, 1924, and it was the first exhibition of folk art held in the United States. Because of her passion for folk art, this initial display led to the first official public exhibition of folk art in a demonstration. Although her interactions with artists at the Whitney Studio Club inspired her to personally collect modern art, her collections of nineteenth-century and older folk art and decorative arts were larger and more significant. Force's apartment on Eighth Street was decorated in a Victorian style, contrary to contemporaneous tastes, and her home at Barley Sheaf Farm in Doylestown was filled with her folk art collection, which she primarily acquired from rural antique dealers and included portraits by early American limners, theorem paintings on velvet, and eclectic objects like cigar store Indians and toys.

In 1929, Whitney assigned Force to contact the Metropolitan Museum of Art to prepare a plan for a donation of Whitney's collection. Whitney's art collection gift was to be displayed in a new wing she partly financed. The museum turned down the gift and Whitney then displayed her work in her own studios and galleries, which were under her name. Force managed these art enterprises and in 1930, she became director of the new Whitney Museum of American Art that developed from these businesses. Force was not trained as an art historian; she hired Lloyd Goodrich, an art historian, to be curator of the Whitney Museum of American Art, which is best-known in the US for displaying new and unusual styles of modern art from living artists. Force's passion for new styles of art and her organizational traits made her an administrative director of the nationally known art museum, which is notable for work from the twentieth and twenty-first centuries.

Whitney Museum of American Art's headquarters was temporarily located at Force's apartment at 8 West Eighth Street, Manhattan. The opening of the museum had been scheduled for November 16, 1930, but was postponed until April 1931, according to an announcement made by Force on October 26, 1930. The change was due to an expansion of the museum, which included the remodeling of three buildings. The museum opened to the public on November 18, 1931.

The museum came into possession of a large collection of American primitive folk art by early American artists which was said to be the only one of its kind in the world. Some of the artists that did the work were unknown and others were traveling coaches and portrait painters of American pioneering days. Eleven large exhibition rooms were arranged to house the museum's collection of more than 400 paintings by American artists from 1880 to 1930 with collections of contemporary sculpture and prints.

The delay in opening the museum allowed the staff to conduct a more ambitious educational plan than was first planned. A series of 20 monographs on American artists suitable for school use was prepared and offered for sale at the time of the opening. Books formed the nucleus of an increasing series, which were intended to form a comprehensive library on American art. Lectures, debates, discussion forums and gallery tours were also a part of the museum's educational plan. For the first year, the permanent collection was on view. Later, special group and single-artist exhibitions were occasionally placed on view and an annual showing of recent acquisitions was planned. The museum extended its activities to other parts of the United States by arranging circuit exhibitions and lecture tours.

Later life and death
Force became chair of the American Art Research Council in 1942. The Whitney Museum of American Art merged with the Metropolitan Museum of Art in 1943 and Force was an advisory director of the institution. In 1946, the United States government mounted a national touring exhibition of German art and war booty, and shortly afterwards, Force undertook to return the art to its rightful owner. Under Force's direction, between 1946 and 1948, The Whitney Museum of American Art  exhibited of the works of Albert Pinkham Ryder, Winslow Homer, and Robert Feke to promote public awareness of their art.

Juliana R. Force died in New York City on August 28, 1948, and was buried at Doylestown Cemetery, Pennsylvania. In 1949, the museum held a memorial exhibition in her honor.

Personal life
Juliana Reiser married Willard Force in 1911. The couple were childless and her husband died in 1928.

References

Bibliography

External links
 Dictionary of Art Historians biographical entry

1876 births
1948 deaths
American art collectors
Women art collectors
People from Doylestown, Pennsylvania
Northfield Mount Hermon School alumni
People associated with the Whitney Museum of American Art
Museum administrators